James Cameron (1868 – 1934) was a Scottish footballer who played as a defender. He made four appearances for Liverpool in the Football League First Division during the 1894–95 season. His clubs in Scotland included Rangers, Glasgow Perthshire, Linthouse and Pollokshields Athletic. At representative level, he played once for the Scottish Football Alliance XI against the rival Scottish Football League in 1892.

References

1868 births
1934 deaths
Scottish footballers
Liverpool F.C. players
Rangers F.C. players
Glasgow Perthshire F.C. players
Association football defenders
English Football League players
Linthouse F.C. players
Pollokshields Athletic F.C. players